Death's Design is Blakkheim's fourth and final album, released under the moniker of Diabolical Masquerade and his most experimental. The album is broken up into 20 movements, the shortest of which is just 6 seconds long. Also, the album seems to be without genre, changing directions many times. According to the last update of Blakkheim's website, it was to be an original motion picture soundtrack to a movie that was never made but that turned out to be a prank on everyone by Blakkheim. The European version features 61 tracks while the US release has 36, and both have a similar length.

Track listing 

| Notes: The tracks are in 20 Movements

Credits
Diabolical Masquerade
Blakkheim - rhythm/lead/ acoustic and midi guitars, ambiances and vocals
Dan Swanö - Keyboards, ambiences and lead guitar solo on "Keeping Faith" plus keyboard solo on "A Hurricane Of Rotten Air" (Session musician)
Sean C. Bates - Drums and percussion (Session musician)
Ingmar Döhn - Bass guitar (Session musician)

The Maalten Quartet, Estonia
Artieer Garsnek - violin #1
Jaak Gunst - violin #2
Heiki Schmolski - violin #3
Elmo Meltz - viola

Other Personnel
AAG (Dag Swanö) - Guitar solo on "Possession Of The Voodoo Party", "Frenzy Moods And Other Oddities", "They Come, You Go", "Still Part Of The Design - The Hunt (Part III)" and "The Defiled Feeds"
Patrik Sesfors - jazz guitar on "Overlooked Parts" and "Mastering The Clock"
Konstantin Uweholst - cello
Jaari Fleger - grand piano

References

2001 albums
Avantgarde Music albums
Diabolical Masquerade albums
Albums produced by Dan Swanö
Albums with cover art by Travis Smith (artist)